U.S. Military Television Network is a planned specialty television channel distributed through satellite television and cable television companies.

It positions itself as "a new 24 hour cable television network designed to introduce America to the personnel and their families that make up the U.S. Military".

Its founder is Lauren Kelly, who is married to a Marine.

References
 The Daily News (Jacksonville, North Carolina):  I want my USMTV: spouse launches network

External links
US Military Television Network

United States military support organizations
Television networks in the United States
Mass media of the military of the United States